The following is a list of locations where albatrosses breed, together with a list of the species found at each location.

North Pacific Ocean
Bonin Islands - black-footed, Laysan
French Frigate Shoals - Laysan, black-footed
Guadalupe Island (Mexico) - Laysan
Hawaii - Laysan
Izu Islands, Japan - short-tailed (Tori Shima only), black-footed
Laysan Island - Laysan, black-footed
Midway Island - Laysan, black-footed
Southern Ryukyu Islands - black-footed

South America

Islands off Ecuador
Española Island (Hood Island), Galápagos - waved
Isla de la Plata - waved

Subantarctic islands of South America
Diego de Almagro Island, Chile - black-browed
Diego Ramírez Islands - grey-headed
Evangelistas Islets - black-browed
Ildefonso Islands - grey-headed, black-browed
Isla de los Estados, Argentina - black-browed

South Atlantic Ocean
Falkland Islands - black-browed
South Georgia - wandering, black-browed, grey-headed, light-mantled

Tristan group
Gough Island - Tristan, Atlantic yellow-nosed, sooty
Inaccessible Island - Tristan, Atlantic yellow-nosed
Nightingale Islands - Atlantic yellow-nosed
Tristan da Cunha - Tristan (formerly), Atlantic yellow-nosed, sooty

Indian Ocean
Amsterdam Island - Amsterdam, Indian yellow-nosed, sooty
Crozet Islands - wandering, Salvin's, black-browed, grey-headed, Indian yellow-nosed, sooty, light-mantled
Heard and McDonald Islands - wandering, black-browed, light-mantled
Kerguelen Islands - wandering, black-browed, grey-headed, Indian yellow-nosed, sooty, light-mantled; a single Salvin's has nested
Marion Island - wandering, grey-headed, sooty, light-mantled
Prince Edward Island - wandering, grey-headed, Indian yellow-nosed, sooty, light-mantled
Saint Paul - Indian yellow-nosed, sooty

New Zealand

South Island, North Island, and nearby islands
Solander Island (offshore from the South Island) - Buller's (Pacific form)
Taiaroa Head, on Otago Peninsula in the South Island - northern royal
Three Kings Island (offshore from the North Island) - Buller's (nominate form)

Subantarctic islands of New Zealand
Antipodes Islands - Antipodean (race antipodensis), shy (race steadi), black-browed, light-mantled
Auckland Islands - Gibson's, southern royal (Enderby only), northern royal (Enderby only), shy (race steadi), light-mantled
Bounty Islands - Salvin's
Campbell Island - Antipodean (race antipodensis), southern royal, black-browed, Campbell, grey-headed, light-mantled, sooty
Chatham Islands - northern royal, Chatham (Pyramid Rock only), Buller's (Pacific form), Indian yellow-nosed (shy, race steadi, has also bred here twice)
Snares - Salvin's, black-browed, Buller's (nominate form); Chatham has also made a single unsuccessful breeding attempt here

Tasmania
Albatross Island - shy (race cauta)
Mewstone - shy (race cauta)
Pedra Branca - shy (race cauta)

Subantarctic islands of Tasmania
Macquarie Island - wandering, black-browed, grey-headed, light-mantled
Bishop and Clerk Islets - black-browed

References

del Hoyo, Josep, Andrew Elliott and Jordi Sargatal Handbook of the Birds of the World Volume 1 (1992) 
Shirihai, Hadoram A Complete Guide to Antarctic Wildlife 

Albatrosses
Albatrosses